Amaranthus furcatus is a species of plant in the family Amaranthaceae. It is endemic to Ecuador.

References

Endemic flora of Ecuador
furcatus
Data deficient plants
Taxonomy articles created by Polbot